Afrim Tola (born 10 April 1970) is an Albanian former professional footballer who played as a midfielder. He has previously been the director of KS Partizani Tirana in the 2000s.

References

External links
 
 
 
 

1970 births
Living people
Albanian footballers
Association football midfielders
Kategoria Superiore players
FK Dinamo Tirana players
KF Tirana players
FK Partizani Tirana players
KF Teuta Durrës players
Albania international footballers
Albanian sportsperson-politicians
Albanian politicians